Lancashire wrestling is a historic submission wrestling style from Lancashire in England. It is considered an ancestor of catch wrestling, professional and amateur wrestling.

The style included groundwork, submissions, throws and had a reputation as a particularly violent and dangerous sport. Sources show that rules were put in place in order to safeguard the wrestlers from serious injury. For instance, there was a ban on breaking an opponent's bones.

In the counties to the north, Cumberland and Westmorland wrestling developed with rules designed to minimize injury to the participants.

References

External links 
History of the Aspull Olympic Wrestling Club in Lancashire.
A brief history of wrestling in England.
An article on Cornish wrestling, for comparison.

Folk wrestling styles
European martial arts
Wrestling in England
History of Lancashire
Sports originating in England